Niclas Fredrik Olof Malmberg (born May 4, 1970) is a Swedish politician, who in 2014-2018 was a member of the Riksdag (Swedish parliament) and cultural and media policy spokesperson for the Green Party and a member of the Riksdag's Culture Committee.

Biography

Malmberg has a degree as a science journalist from JMK, and has worked as an editor at Östhammar's news and free newspaper in Uppsala. During 1995-1997, Malmberg was a convener of the Young Greens.

Malmberg was municipal commissioner in Uppsala between 2002 and 2010 for the Green Party. Since 2007, he has been a member of the Administrative Foundation for Swedish Radio, Swedish Television and Educational Radio, and since 2009 a member of the Press Support Committee. He was also a member of the state inquiry into press support, Diversity and Reach, and the Media Constitution Committee. Malmberg joined the Government in September 2016. Since 2013, he has been a board member of Sweden's wind power cooperative  and since 2017 a member of the Public broadcasting Inquiry.

Since 2016, Malmberg has been chairman of the Green Party in Uppsala County.

Malmberg has also worked as an editor and writer, including writing a textbook on the climate issue aimed at children and young people, the "Little Climate Book", and the music story "Operation save the park".

Intimidation letter received from the Chinese Embassy

On August 19, 2020, Malmberg revealed a threatening letter sent to him by the Chinese Embassy in Sweden. The letter requested that he should not speak for Falun Gong, threatened his reputation and demanded a meeting with him.

References

External links
 Niclas Malmberg (MP) – riksdagen.se
 Miljöpartiet de Gröna om Niclas Malmberg

1970 births
Members of the Riksdag from the Green Party
Municipal commissioners of Sweden
Living people